Crychan Forest Tracks is a Site of Special Scientific Interest in Carmarthen & Dinefwr,  Wales. It was chosen as a special stage in the British Rally from 2006 to 2008.

See also
List of Sites of Special Scientific Interest in Carmarthen & Dinefwr

References

External links
 Research Report: Quality of the Visitor Experience 2014: Crychan

Sites of Special Scientific Interest in Carmarthen & Dinefwr
Rally GB